The following is a list of films produced in the Kannada film industry in India in 1966, presented in alphabetical order.

See also
Kannada films of 1965
Kannada films of 1967

References

External links
 Kannada Movies of 1966's at the Internet Movie Database
 http://www.bharatmovies.com/kannada/info/moviepages.htm
 http://www.kannadastore.com/

1966
Kannada
Films, Kannada